Masquerade is a picture book, written and illustrated by Kit Williams and published in August 1979, that sparked a treasure hunt by including concealed clues to the location of a jewelled golden hare that had been created and hidden somewhere in Britain by Williams. The book became the inspiration for a genre of books known today as armchair treasure hunts.

In March 1982 Williams received a letter and sketch from a man called Dugald Thompson, which he acknowledged as the first correct solution to the puzzle, meaning that Thompson had won the contest. It was later found that Thompson had not solved the puzzle and had guessed the hare's location using insider knowledge obtained from a former acquaintance of Williams. The revelation caused a minor scandal. Two British physics teachers were later acknowledged to be the first to have correctly solved the puzzle.

Book
In the 1970s, Williams was challenged by Tom Maschler, of the British publishing firm Jonathan Cape, to do "something no one has ever done before" with a picture book. Williams set out to create a book that readers would study carefully rather than flip through and then discard. The book's theme, a hunt for a valuable treasure, became his means to this end. Masquerade contains fifteen detailed paintings that illustrate the story of a hare named Jack Hare, who seeks to carry a treasure from the Moon (depicted as a woman) to the Sun (depicted as a man). On reaching the Sun, Jack finds that he has lost the treasure, and the reader is challenged to discover its location.

Along with creating the book, Williams crafted 18-carat (75%) gold and jewels into a large filigree pendant in the shape of a hare. He sealed the hare inside a small ceramic casket, both to protect the prize from soil and to foil attempts to locate the treasure using a metal detector. The casket was inscribed with the legend "I am the keeper of the jewel of Masquerade, which lies waiting safe inside me for you or eternity".

Kit Williams later said:
If I was to spend two years on the sixteen paintings for Masquerade I wanted them to mean something. I recalled how, as a child, I had come across "treasure hunts" in which the puzzles were not exciting nor the treasure worth finding. So I decided to make a real treasure, of gold, bury it in the ground and paint real puzzles to lead people to it. The key was to be Catherine of Aragon's Cross at Ampthill, near Bedford, casting a shadow like the pointer of a sundial.

On 7 August 1979, Williams and celebrity witness Bamber Gascoigne secretly buried the hare's casket at Ampthill Park. Williams announced publicly that his forthcoming book contained all clues necessary to identify the treasure's precise location in Britain to "within a few inches." At the time, the only additional clue he provided was that the hare was buried on public property that could be easily accessed. To ensure that readers from further afield had an equal chance of winning, Williams also announced that he would accept the first precisely correct answer sent to him by post.

A modified version of the book appeared in Italian, with a treasure buried in Italy. The book was reinvented and translated by Joan Arnold and Lilli Denon with the name Il tesoro di Masquerade (Emme Edizioni).

Search
The book sold hundreds of thousands of copies worldwide, many in the United Kingdom, but some also in Australia, South Africa, West Germany, Japan (where the book was called 仮面舞踏会 kamenbutoukai, meaning a masquerade ball or masked ball), France and the United States. Searchers often dug up public and private property, acting on hunches. One location in England named "Haresfield Beacon" was a popular site for searchers, and Williams paid the cost of a sign notifying searchers that the hare was not hidden nearby. Real-life locations reproduced in the paintings were searched by treasure hunters, including Sudbury Hall in Derbyshire and Tewkesbury, Gloucestershire.

In March 1982, Williams received a letter containing a sketch which he recognised as the first correct solution sent to him. Williams telephoned the sender, a man calling himself "Ken Thomas". Williams instructed him to dig for the hare. He realised that Thomas had not solved the puzzle in the intended manner, and it seemed that he had made a lucky guess. Soon after Thomas was formally awarded the prize, Williams received a correct solution to the puzzle, sent by physics teachers Mike Barker of William Hulme's Grammar School and John Rousseau of Rossall School. Barker and Rousseau seemed to have unearthed the prize themselves when digging at Ampthill, but had not noticed it inside its clay box; it appeared that Thomas had discovered it in the dirt piles they had left behind.

Bamber Gascoigne, having been asked by Williams to witness the burial of the hare and to document the contest from beginning to end, wrote the book Quest for the Golden Hare. He summarised his experiences thus:

Tens of thousands of letters from Masqueraders have convinced me that the human mind has an equal capacity for pattern-matching and self-deception. While some addicts were busy cooking the riddle, others were more single-mindedly continuing their own pursuit of the hare quite regardless of the news that it had been found. Their own theories had come to seem so convincing that no exterior evidence could refute them. These most determined of Masqueraders may grudgingly have accepted that a hare of some sort was dug up at Ampthill, but they believed there would be another hare, or a better solution, awaiting them at their favourite spot.  Kit would expect them to continue undismayed by the much publicised diversion at Ampthill and would be looking forward to the day when he would greet them as the real discoverers of the real puzzle of Masquerade. Optimistic expeditions were still setting out, with shovels and maps, throughout the summer of 1982.

Solution

Masquerade'''s puzzle is elaborate. The answer is hidden in the 15 painted illustrations. In each painting, a line must be drawn from each depicted creature's left eye through the longest digit on its left hand, and out to one of the letters in the page border. Then from the left eye through the longest digit on the left foot; the right eye through the longest digit on the right hand; and finally the right eye through the longest digit on the right foot. This is only done for eyes and digits that are visible in the painting. The letters indicated by these lines can be made to form words, either by treating them as anagrams or by applying the sequence of animals and digits suggested by the Isaac Newton painting (pictured). Following this method reveals fifteen words or short phrases, which together form a nineteen-word message:

CATHERINE'S LONG FINGER OVER SHADOWS EARTH BURIED YELLOW AMULET MIDDAY POINTS THE HOUR IN LIGHT OF EQUINOX LOOK YOU

The acrostic of these words and phrases reads "CLOSEBYAMPTHILL". Properly interpreted, the message tells the reader that the treasure is buried in Ampthill Park in Bedfordshire, near the park's cross-shaped monument to Catherine of Aragon, at the precise spot touched by the tip of the monument's shadow at noon on the day of either the March or September equinox.

Many additional hints and "confirmers" are scattered throughout the book. For example, in the painting depicting the Sun and the Moon dancing around the Earth, the hands of the two figures are clasped together, pointing at the date of the spring equinox.

Sunday Times clue
On 21 December 1980 the Sunday Times published an additional clue created by Kit Williams to the puzzle. This drawing needed to be cut out, folded in half and then with a light shone through a message could be read in a mirror. The message read "To do my work, I appointed four men from twenty, the tallest and the fattest, and the righteous follow the sinister."

The "...four men from twenty" refers to four fingers and toes out of twenty digits; "...the tallest and the fattest" relates to using the longest digits; "..the righteous follow the sinister" provides a clue to the decoding of the letter order (left (sinister) eyes through left finger and toe first, then the righteous (right) ones). The clue featured a self portrait of Kit Williams surrounded by fourteen animals, the first letter of each making "Merry Christmas".

Scandal
On 11 December 1988, The Sunday Times printed a story accusing the winner of the Masquerade contest of being a fraud. "Ken Thomas" was revealed as a pseudonym of a man called Dugald Thompson. Thompson's business partner, John Guard, was the boyfriend of Veronica Robertson, who had previously been a girlfriend of Kit Williams. Guard allegedly convinced Robertson to help him win the contest because they were both animal rights activists and he promised to donate any profits to the animal rights cause.The Sunday Times alleged that while living with Williams, Robertson had learned the approximate physical location of the hare, while remaining ignorant of the proper solution to the book's main puzzle. After supposedly finding out from Robertson that the hare was in Ampthill, Guard and two associates were said to have started searching for it using metal detectors. After searching for some time with no success, they drew a crude sketch of the location, which Thompson then submitted to Williams under the name "Ken Thomas", and it was this that Williams acknowledged as the first correct answer.

Reacting to the revelations, Williams said: "This tarnishes Masquerade and I'm shocked by what has emerged. I feel a deep sense of responsibility to all those many people who were genuinely looking for it. Although I didn't know it, it was a skeleton in my cupboard and I'm relieved it has come out."

Legacy
Dugald Thompson founded a software company called Haresoft, and offered the jewel as a prize to a new contest which took the form of a computer game, Hareraiser. The company and its game (which many believe to be unsolvable with only meaningless text and graphics), were unsuccessful, yielding no winner. When the company went into liquidation in 1988, the hare was sold at Sotheby's London on behalf of the liquidators, Peat Marwick, in December 1988. The hare sold for £31,900 to an anonymous buyer. Williams himself went there to bid, but dropped out at £6,000.

The treasure's whereabouts remained unknown for over 20 years, until it came to light in 2009. The BBC Radio 4 programme The Grand Masquerade, broadcast 14 July 2009, told the story of the creation and solution of the puzzle. Williams was interviewed and presenter John O'Farrell claimed that this was the first time Williams had talked about the scandal for 20 years. During the interview Williams expressed the desire to see the hare again. Hearing this, the granddaughter of its then current owner—an anonymous purchaser "based in the Far East"—arranged for Williams to be reunited briefly with his work. This was featured in a television documentary, The Man Behind the Masquerade, which aired on BBC Four on 2 December 2009.

The hare was on display at the V&A Museum, London, as part of its "British Design 1948–2012" retrospective in 2012.Masquerade became the forerunner of an entire genre of cryptic puzzles known as armchair treasure hunts. It spawned a succession of books and games from other publishers seeking to emulate its success, including The Key To The Kingdom (Pavilion Books, 1992), The Piper Of Dreams (Hodder & Stoughton, 1982), The Secret (Bantam Books, 1982), The Golden Key (William Maclellan, 1982), Treasure: In Search of the Golden Horse (Intravision, 1984), The Merlin Mystery (Warner Books, 1998) and the French On the Trail of the Golden Owl (Manya, 1993), which is still unsolved. Kit Williams himself also created a second treasure-hunt book, The Bee on the Comb (1984).

Similar hunts have continued being published in various formats. Alkemstone (Level-10, 1981), a computer game developed during the height of the Masquerade hype, is still unsolved. Many later hunts make use of technologies that were unavailable when Masquerade was published, such as the web-based homage Menagerie, the CD-ROM based Treasure Quest, and Text4Treasure, which uses SMS messaging. Others, such as Army Of Zero and West By Sea: A Treasure Hunt that Spans the Globe (Expeditionaire, 2016) follow Masquerade use of physical media for the main puzzles, but provide additional clues online.

The book is one of the subjects presented in Brian Moriarty's 2002 presentation "The Secret of Psalm 46" in regarding to game design, easter eggs, and conspiracy theory.

References

Select bibliography
Kit Williams, Masquerade, London: Jonathan Cape, 1979
Kit Williams, Masquerade: The Complete Book with the Answer Explained , London: Jonathan Cape, 1982 [paperback]
Bamber Gascoigne, Quest for the Golden Hare'', London: Jonathan Cape, 1983

External links
 Page-by-page explanation of the solution
 Additional details of the scandal

1979 books
Puzzle hunts
Puzzle books